Yeadon may refer to:

Places
Yeadon, West Yorkshire, England, a small town near Leeds
Yeadon Airport, a locally used name for Leeds Bradford International Airport
Yeadon, Pennsylvania, USA
Yeadon station (disambiguation), stations of the name

People
Daniel Yeadon, British-born Australian cellist and viola da gambist
Harry Yeadon (1922–2015), British civil engineer
James Yeadon (1861–1914), English cricketer
Jim Yeadon (born 1949), American politician from Wisconsin
John Yeadon (born 1948), British artist
Kim Yeadon (born 1956), Australian politician
Michael Yeadon, British pharmacologist and conspiracy theorist
Peter Yeadon (born 1965), American architect and designer
Willie Yeadon (1907–1997), English railway historian